Kuppupillai Chavadi is a small village of Kattumannarkoil Town Panchayat, Cuddalore district, Tamil Nadu, India.  It is the 16th ward of Kattumannarkoil town Panchayat. Kuppupillai Chavadi consists of two streets, North street & South street. It is located 2 km away from Kattumannarkoil Bus stand.

Adjacent communities

References 

Villages in Cuddalore district